Ernest Hecht  (21 September 1929 – 13 February 2018) was a British publisher, producer, and philanthropist. In 1951, he founded Souvenir Press Ltd, one of the very few remaining independently owned major publishing houses in Great Britain. In 2003 he set up the Ernest Hecht Charitable Foundation. Described by The Bookseller as "one of a number of émigrés who changed the face of British publishing after the Second World War alongside George Weidenfeld, Paul Hamlyn and André Deutsch", Hecht has been called "the last of the great publishers". He was awarded an OBE in the Queen's Birthday Honours List for services to Publishing and Charity in June 2015. In August 2015, he was honoured by the President of Brazil with the Order of Rio Branco, which was presented to Hecht at a ceremony by the Brazilian Ambassador in London.

Early life
Born in 1929 in Czechoslovakia, the son of clothing manufacturers Richard and Annie Hecht, Ernest Hecht arrived in Britain as a Kindertransport (Jewish refugee) child in 1939; he recalls: "On the train to England as a young man, I remember throwing up on one of the Gestapo. My mother must have been terrified but the man said it was ok because he had children of his own." He was evacuated to Wiltshire, then to Minehead, Somerset. In the mid-1940s he attended Quintin School in Regent Street, London (later to become Quintin Kynaston School in Swiss Cottage), and went on to read Economics and Commerce at Hull University College.

Publishing

Hecht started Souvenir Press in 1951 in his bedroom at his parents' flat with a loan of £250, "a bed, a desk, a typewriter and a phone in the hall", his first book being "a paperback on cricket entitled Len Hutton: The World's Greatest Batsman, written by a college friend and retailing at two shillings (ten pence)." Hecht successfully built the business up and ran the company for more than six decades.

Producing an eccentric list of titles ("His authors have ranged from Argentine revolutionary Che Guevara to comic chronicler of the British upper classes, PG Wodehouse, from Norwegian Kon Tiki adventurer Thor Heyerdahl to tap dance legend Fred Astaire...") from a notoriously untidy office in Bloomsbury, Hecht was quoted as saying: "Anyone can create a high-class literary list of prestige titles. It's better to have a balanced list, comprising books that make money and those perhaps more worthy titles that don't. My adage is that a publisher’s first duty to an author is to remain solvent." Nevertheless, characterised as a risk-taker, he also expressed the view that, as a publisher: "You have the freedom, and I'd be inclined to say, the duty, to publish books of a minority interest and titles whose time may not yet have arrived or ideas that challenge received wisdom." As he said in an interview with Matthew Engel: "The rule of independent publishing is that there are no rules."

Souvenir Press had more than 500 titles in print by the time of Hecht's death in 2018 and had number-one bestsellers on both sides of the Atlantic. Book series published by Souvenir included Condor Books, Human Horizons and Independent Voices. Hecht celebrated the company's 65th anniversary in April 2016. He published five Nobel laureates, including Norwegian novelist Knut Hamsun and the Chilean poet Pablo Neruda.

Hecht received the British Book Awards Lifetime Achievement award in 2001 and was a chairman of the Society of Bookmen.

Music and theatre
Ernest Hecht and Souvenir Press also produced concerts and presented many theatrical productions, including Uproar in the House, with Brian Rix, Joan Sims, and Nicholas Parsons; Sign Here Please by Valentin Kataev, adapted by Marty Feldman, with Terry Scott, Peter Jones and Ambrosine Phillpotts; and most recently The World's Wife by Carol Ann Duffy, with Sinéad Cusack, Harriet Walter, Jan Watson, Lynn Farleigh and Barb Jungr.

The Ernest Hecht Charitable Foundation
Set up in 2003, the Ernest Hecht Charitable Foundation has the aim of providing financial and practical assistance that can "making a difference to people's lives". The Foundation aims to support the work of other charitable organisations in helping the disadvantaged and promoting the advancement of the arts and education by making grants, with the aim of making a difference in a particular field.

Charities and organisations the Foundation has so far been able to support include: Lucy Cavendish College, Cambridge; Cardboard Citizens; University College London; Chickenshed Theatre; The National Gallery's Dame Myra Hess Day; Whizz-Kidz; Royal College of Music; React – Rapid Effective Assistance for Children with Potentially Terminal illness; Alzheimer's Society "Singing for the Brain" groups; Action for Blind People; InterAct Reading Service; Mildmay Mission Hospital; Dementia Care; Resource: The Jewish Employment Advice Centre; Scottish Disability Golf Partnership; British Limbless Ex-Service Men's Association; Tricycle Theatre; Macmillan Centre Clinical Nurse Specialists; Salvation Army; RAF Benevolent Fund; St John's Hospice; Marie Curie Cancer Care Nurses; St John's Ambulance.

Awards
Hecht's awards include the Specsavers National Book Awards 2001 Lifetime Achievement Award, the Neruda Medal presented by the Chilean government, and an honorary fellowship of University College London, in 2006.

He was made an Officer of the Order of the British Empire (OBE) in the Queen's Birthday Honours List for services to Publishing and Charity in June 2015. In August 2015, he was honoured with Brazil's Order of Rio Branco, in recognition of his contribution to promoting Brazilian culture in the English-speaking world, through publishing some of Brazil's most notable writers, such as Jorge Amado, Fernando Sabino and Carolina Maria de Jesus.

In April 2016 Hecht was awarded the London Book Fair Simon Master Chairman's Award.

Personal life
Hecht lived and worked in London, where he was a long-standing supporter of Arsenal Football Club: he took his Arsenal hat with him to Buckingham Palace when accepting his OBE from Prince Charles. Hecht was the literary agent of Brazilian footballer Pelé and found the time to attend nine of the past 11 World Cup finals by 2002. In 2016 Hecht dismissed suggestions of an autobiography with the words: "Publishers' books never sell."

He died in hospital in London after a short illness, on 13 February 2018. Unmarried and without children or heir, Hecht was reported as having said: "I’m not unduly worried what happens to Souvenir when I’m not here for the simple reason that I won’t be here."

References

External links
 Souvenir Press website.
 The Ernest Hecht Charitable Foundation.
 Michael Allen, "Ernest Hecht and the Souvenir Press", Grumpy Old Bookman, 12 September 2007.
 John Gulliver, "The freedom to publish and the duty to challenge", Camden New Journal, 27 October 2011.
 Matthew Engel, "Nobel prize winners and stocking fillers – 65 years in the murky waters of London publishing", The Guardian, 2 April 2016.

Obituaries
 "Obituary: Ernest Hecht", The Times, 15 February 2018.
 Liz Thomson, "Ernest Hecht obituary", The Guardian, 19 February 2018.
 "Ernest Hecht, independent publisher – obituary", The Telegraph, 28 February 2018.

1929 births
2018 deaths
British book publishers (people)
Officers of the Order of the British Empire
Alumni of the University of Hull
Kindertransport refugees
Jewish emigrants from Nazi Germany to the United Kingdom
Czechoslovak emigrants to the United Kingdom
Literary agents
20th-century British philanthropists